Brock's yellow-eared bat (Vampyriscus brocki) is a species of bat in the family Phyllostomidae, the leaf-nosed bats. It is native to Brazil, Colombia, Guyana, Suriname, French Guiana, and Peru.

This bat lives in evergreen forest. It eats mostly fruit. It breeds during the rainy season.

References

Bats of South America
Mammals of Colombia
Mammals of Guyana
Phyllostomidae
Mammals described in 1968